Justus Miles Forman (November 1, 1875 – May 7, 1915) was an American novelist and playwright.

Biography
Forman was born on November 1, 1875 in Le Roy, New York. He attended Yale University.

His only play, The Hyphen, appeared in 1915 but did not receive the success Forman expected. The Hyphen was a topical drama about "German-Americans" and "Irish-Americans" whose patriotism and fidelity to the United States is questioned due to events in Europe during World War I. Forman hoped that the drama would do better business in a production in London and decided to book a first-class passage aboard the RMS Lusitania. Days before he was to board the liner, however, he received a mysterious phone call from a man with a thick German accent who warned him not to board the Lusitania. Forman ignored the phone call and embarked on the Lusitania on May 1, 1915. The Lusitania was torpedoed on May 7, 1915, and Forman was among the 1,198 passengers who perished in the sinking. His body was never recovered.

Works
 Garden of Lies (1902)
 Jason (1909)
 Bianca's Daughter (1910)
 The Opening Door
 The Unknown Lady
 Journey's End
 Island of Enchantment
 Monsigny: The Soul Of Gold
 Tommy Carteret
 Buchanan’s Wife 
 A Modern Ulysses.
 The Quest. 
 The Court Of The Angels. 
 The Harvest Moon.
 The Six Rubies.

References

External links
 
 
 
  at the Internet Movie Database

20th-century American novelists
American male novelists
Deaths on the RMS Lusitania
1875 births
1915 deaths
Yale University alumni
People from Le Roy, New York
20th-century American dramatists and playwrights
American male dramatists and playwrights
20th-century American male writers